Bourdotia may refer to:
 Bourdotia (bivalve), a genus of bivalves in the family Lucinidae
 Bourdotia (fungus), a genus of fungi